Barag may refer to:
Barag tribe, a tribe of Mongols
New Barag Left Banner, subdivision of Inner Mongolia, China
New Barag Right Banner, subdivision of Inner Mongolia, China
Old Barag Banner, subdivision of Inner Mongolia, China
Barag, Iran (disambiguation), villages in South Khorasan Province, Iran

See also
Barg (disambiguation)
Barak (disambiguation)